Hungama House is a 2019 one shot Gujarati romantic comedy film directed by Hanif Chippa and produced by Savya Bhati under the banner of Red Velvet Cinema. Starring Jeet Kumar, Kanwat Taff, Chini Raval, Chetan Daiya, Hemant Jha, Harikrishna Dave and Madhavi Jhaveri, its  cinematography is by Sahil Khan and editing by Gul Ansari. The film was released nationwide by Rupam Entertainment Pvt Ltd, on 13 September 2019.

Plot 

Jitu is in love with Meera, and wants to marry her. The only problem is the one condition set by Meera`s foster family: the guy marrying her should be an orphan just like her, for the sake of better compatibility and understanding. Willing to go to any lengths for Meera, Jitu lies that he is an orphan, and hence begins a series of misadventures where Jitu tries his best to keep up the charade - and save his love life! But can he?

Cast 
 Jeet Kumar as Jitu
 Kanwal Taff as Meera 
 Chetan Daiya as Ravi
 Chini Raval as Priya 
 Hemant Jha as Advocate Dhanani
 Harikrishna Dave as Pankaj 
 Madhavi Jhaveri as Pankhudi 
 Jignesh Modi as Gagaji 
 Nimesh Soni as Ramji Bhai
 Brijal as Rupal 
 Harish Dagia as Inspector Jordar 
Utsav Shah as Aadu

Production
Hungama House is Gujarati Comedy Film. Which shoot in 28 Days schedule in Ahmedabad.   Music of the film is given by Paresh and Bhavesh. Songs have been Sung by Nakash Aziz, Falguni Pathak, Palak Muchhal,  Osman Mir, Fahad Bhivadivala, Tarnnum Malik . Zee Music Company is the official music label of the film

Soundtrack

Music for the film is composed by Paresh and Bhavesh and lyrics are written by Iqbal Qureshi and Paresh Hingu.

Release
The official trailer of the film was released on 12 August 2019.

The film was released on 13 September 2019.

References

External links
 

2019 films
Films shot in India
Films shot in Gujarat
Indian romantic comedy films
2010s Gujarati-language films
2019 romantic comedy films